Christina Becker (born 12 December 1977, in Dortmund) is a German female  track cyclist, and part of the national team. She competed in the team pursuit event at the 2009 UCI Track Cycling World Championships.

Her younger sister Charlotte Becker is also a track cyclist and competed together with her in the team pursuit.

References

External links
 
 

1977 births
Living people
German track cyclists
German female cyclists
Cyclists from Dortmund